Life is the third studio album by funk/soul band Sly and the Family Stone, released in September 1968 on Epic/CBS Records. The album was titled M'Lady in the United Kingdom.

Music
Unlike its predecessor, Dance to the Music, Life was not a commercial success, although it has received mostly positive reviews from music critics over the years. Many of its songs, including "M'Lady", "Fun", "Love City", as well as the title track, became popular staples in the Family Stone's live show. A middle ground between the fiery A Whole New Thing and the more commercial Dance to the Music, Life features very little use of studio effects, and is instead more driven by frontman Sly Stone's compositions. Topics for the album's songs include the dating scene ("Dynamite!", "Chicken", "M'Lady"), groupies ("Jane is a Groupee"), and "plastic" (or "fake") people (the Beatlesque "Plastic Jim", which references "Eleanor Rigby" in its chorus). Of particular note is that the Family Stone's main themes of unity and integration are explored here in several songs ("Fun", "Harmony", "Life", and "Love City"). The next Family Stone LP, Stand!, would focus almost exclusively on these topics.

Much of Life has been heavily sampled for hip hop and electronica recordings, particularly Gregg Errico's drum solo on "Love City". The opening riff on "Into My Own Thing" was sampled for Fatboy Slim's 2001 hit "Weapon of Choice".

Track listing
All tracks written by Sylvester Stewart, and produced and arranged by Sly Stone for Stone Flower Productions.

Side one
"Dynamite!" – 2:44
"Chicken" – 2:13
"Plastic Jim" – 3:29
"Fun" – 2:23
"Into My Own Thing" – 2:13
"Harmony" – 2:51

Side two
"Life" – 3:01
"Love City" – 2:43
"I'm an Animal" – 3:21
"M'Lady" – 2:46
"Jane Is a Groupee" – 2:49

CD bonus tracks
1995 limited edition CD reissue
"Only One Way Out of This Mess" (3:51, added for 1995 compact disc rerelease)
2007 limited edition CD reissue
 "Dynamite" (mono single version)
 "Seven More Days" (previously unreleased)
 "Pressure" (previously unreleased)
 "Sorrow" (previously unreleased)

Personnel
Sly and the Family Stone
 Sly Stone – vocals, organ, guitar, piano, harmonica, and more
 Freddie Stone – vocals, guitar
 Larry Graham – vocals, bass guitar
 Rosie Stone – vocals, piano, keyboard
 Cynthia Robinson – trumpet, vocal ad-libs
 Jerry Martini – saxophone
 Greg Errico – drums
 Little Sister (Vet Stone, Mary McCreary, Elva Mouton) – backing vocals
Technical
Marty Wekser - editing supervisor
Don Puluse, Fred Catero, Roy Segal - engineer

References

Sly and the Family Stone albums
1968 albums
Epic Records albums
Albums produced by Sly Stone